The Croatian Journal of Philosophy is a peer-reviewed academic journal of philosophy, publishing articles of diverse currents in English. The journal publishes three issues per year with the support of the Republic of Croatia's Ministry of Culture and the Ministry of Science, Education, and Sports. All issues are available in electronic format from the Central and Eastern European Online Library and the Philosophy Documentation Center.

Between 2002 and 2004, the journal published 61 papers, 57 of which (93%) were written by authors outside Croatia.

Indexing
The Croatian Journal of Philosophy is abstracted and indexed in Article@INIST, Arts & Humanities Citation Index, International Bibliography of Book Reviews of Scholarly Literature (IBR), International Bibliography of Periodical Literature (IBZ), The Philosopher's Index, Philosophy Research Index, PhilPapers, and the Répertoire bibliographique de la philosophie.

See also 
 List of philosophy journals

References

Sources

External links 
 Croatian Journal of Philosophy online

English-language journals
Philosophy journals
Triannual journals
Contemporary philosophical literature
Publications established in 2001
2001 establishments in Croatia
Academic journals of Croatia
Philosophy Documentation Center academic journals